Chong may refer to:

 Chong (surname), the romanization of several Chinese and Korean surnames
 Chong or Pear people of Thailand and Cambodia
 Chong language
 Chong or Limbu people of eastern Nepal, Bhutan, and northeastern India
 ancient Chinese state 崇, allegedly attacked by King Wen of Zhou.

See also
Chung (disambiguation)
Zhong (disambiguation)
Zhang (disambiguation)

Language and nationality disambiguation pages